Crocemosso (or, traditionally,  Croce Mosso) is a frazione of Valle Mosso, in Piedmont, northern Italy.

Since 1929 Crocemosso was a separate comune (municipality), which was unified with the former comune of Valle Inferiore Mosso in the new comune of Valle Mosso.

References

Frazioni of Valdilana
Former municipalities of the Province of Biella